The Battle of Faventia was a battle that took place in September of 82 BC at Faventia during the context of Sulla's Second Civil War. The battle pitted the Optimates under the command of Quintus Caecilius Metellus Pius against the Populares forces commanded by Gaius Norbanus Balbus. The battle resulted in an Optimate victory.

Context 

Through the course of the campaign of 82 BC, the Populares forces had divided into two groups, those in the north under the command of Gnaeus Papirius Carbo, and those in the south who were commanded by Gaius Marius the Younger. Sulla had successfully defeated Marius Battle of Sacriporto and had managed to pin Marius and his fellow survivors under a siege at Preneste. Rome itself soon after had fallen to the Optimates. Soon after, the war had shifted to Etruria where Sulla engaged in a pitched cavalry skirmish against Popular forces near the Glanis River, emerging victorious. His forces managed to defeat those of Gnaeus Papirius Carbo after expelling Carbo from Picenum.

The battle
After expelling Carbo's forces from Picenum, Quintus Caecilius Metellus Pius camped at Faventia having decided to wait for the arrival of Gaius Norbanus Balbus who was marching with his army from Cisalpine Gaul. At the beginning of September, Norbanus Balbus arrived in the region and marched his forces towards Metellus' camp. No sooner had Norbanus Balbus arrived than he gave battle to Metellus' army. His soldiers were tired from their long march and were quickly routed. Norbanus Balbus' army retreated through a vineyard and many of his forces were slaughtered there as they ran. Those that escaped, Norbanus Balbus amongst them, directed themselves towards Ariminum.

See also 
 Lucius Cornelius Sulla Felix

References

Bibliography

Classic Sources 

 Appian, The Civil Wars.

Modern Sources 
 
 
 

82 BC
Faventia
Faventia (82 BC)
Faventia (82 BC)
Faventia